James Joseph Maloney (26 June 1901 – 28 January 1982) was an Australian Labor politician and diplomat.

Early life and career
He was born in Goulburn to baker James Moloney and Mary Ann Pickels. He was educated locally and became a messenger boy, subsequently moving to Sydney to become a bootmaker. On 19 April 1924 he married Emily Dent, with whom he had four children.

He had joined the Labor Party and the Australian Boot Trade Employees' Federation in 1915; he was New South Wales secretary of the union from 1932 to 1943, federal president from 1936 to 1940 and federal secretary from 1940 to 1943.

He was also a delegate to the Trades and Labor Council from 1927 to 1943, an executive member from 1930 to 1943, and president from 1940 to 1943.

Political and diplomatic career
From 1941 to 1972 he was a Labor member of the New South Wales Legislative Council; during this period he was a Minister without Portfolio from 1954 to 1956 and Minister for Labour and Industry from 1956 to 1965. From 1966 to 1971 he was Deputy Leader of the Opposition.

Prime Minister John Curtin appointed him the Australian Minister to the Soviet Union between December 1943 and February 1946. He was granted leave of absence from the Legislative Council to take up this post.

Later life
Maloney died at Kogarah in 1982.

References

1901 births
1982 deaths
Australian trade unionists
Australian Labor Party members of the Parliament of New South Wales
Members of the New South Wales Legislative Council
Ambassadors of Australia to the Soviet Union
20th-century Australian politicians
Burials at Rookwood Cemetery